Jungo is a ghost town located on Humboldt County Route 55 (former Nevada State Route 49), between Winnemucca, Nevada and Sulphur, Nevada.  At one time, Jungo boasted a hotel, store, filling station and blacksmith's shop, though no buildings remain.

The town of Jungo is named for Jungo Point, a survey peak located 11 miles away; in 1888, Jungo Point was a stage stop on a mail route between Winnemucca and "Denio's".

The post office at Jungo was in operation from January 1911 until May 1952. Jungo was a station on the Feather River Route of the Western Pacific Railroad.
In 1913, Jungo consisted of twelve buildings that included the station, a freight shed, a pumping station, a hotel and a saloon.

George Austin lived in Jungo in 1915 and operated the hotel, filling station and general store at Jungo in the 1930s.  In 1935, Austin purchased the Jumbo Mine, located 36 miles away, from two prospectors for $10,000 ($ today) with $500 due immediately.  Mining engineer and former U.S. President Herbert Hoover visited Jungo in 1936 and advised Austin to retain ownership of Jumbo.  Austin offered to pay Hoover for the advice and Hoover replied, "That kind of advice is free."  Austin received many offers for the mine and stated that if he sold the mine for $1,000,000, then he would owe the $420,000 in taxes, but that the taxes don't apply if the gold is in the ground.  Austin was also concerned about his sons becoming "loafers" if they were rich.

In 1937, a group of Texas oilmen including H. L. Hunt placed an option to buy Jumbo Mine with a $250,000 ($ today) down payment.

The Jungo Hotel was in operation in 1955.

In 2012, Recology received a permit to build a Municipal Solid Waste Disposal site at Jungo.

References 

Ghost towns in Humboldt County, Nevada
Ghost towns in Nevada